Evgenia Simonovna Linetskaya (born 30 November 1986) is an Israeli professional tennis player.

She won seven singles titles and one doubles title on the ITF Circuit in her career. On 4 July 2005, she reached her best singles ranking of world No. 35. On 20 February 2006, she peaked at No. 283 in the doubles rankings.

Linetskaya made it to the fourth round of the 2005 Australian Open, where she lost to Amélie Mauresmo.

Biography
Linetskaya was born in Moscow, and is Jewish and plays with a Star of David necklace around her neck. She is coached by George Akopian. Her mother introduced her to tennis at age 6; she hit balls against school building for practice. Her father's Simon Linetsky is a professor of mathematics with a black belt in karate, and her mother Maria is an artist. She studied psychology for three years at Moscow University and plans to study via online education to receive an MBA. She speaks Russian, English and some Dutch. She is superstitious about stepping on court lines.

Tennis career

Early success
In February 2005, Linetskaya beat world No. 11, Vera Zvonareva, 6–4, 6–2 in Pattaya, Thailand. In March, she defeated world No. 2 Amélie Mauresmo in the third round in Indian Wells.

Problems
In late November 2005, her coach Joe Giuliano was barred for life by the WTA Tour for violating section 14, part IV, of the WTA code of conduct, which bars coaches from "non-consensual sexual contact". Her father, Simon Linetskiy, was suspended for two years. The bans resulted from events incidents at La Costa's Acura Classic in August 2005. Linetskiy was charged with suspicion of battery after his daughter had injuries treated at a hospital.

Linetskaya did not play between January 2006 and February 2007. She dropped off the rankings computer altogether.

Comeback
In February 2007, she won the Montechoro tournament in Portugal. The following month, she won both the Ramat HaSharon 2 and the Raanana tournaments in Israel, without dropping a set in either tournament. In doubles, she won at Raanana with Tzipora Obziler.

ITF Circuit finals

Singles: 12 (7–5)

Doubles: 2 (1–1)

See also
List of select Jewish tennis players

References

External links
 
 
 Interview, 3/13/05
 

1986 births
Living people
Israeli female tennis players
Israeli people of Russian-Jewish descent
Jewish tennis players
Russian emigrants to Israel
Tennis players from Moscow